Schefflera stellata is a species of flowering plant in the family Araliaceae. It is a canopy tree that is native to the Western Ghats of India, and parts of Sri Lanka.

References

 India Biodiversity Portal
 Kerala plants
 Volatile oils of Schefflera stellata
 Phytojournal

stellata
Flora of India (region)
Flora of Sri Lanka
Plants described in 1791
Taxa named by Henri Ernest Baillon
Taxa named by Joseph Gaertner